Josh Rickett (born 20 October 1997), also known by the nicknames of "Ricko", and "Jack", is an English professional rugby league footballer who last played for Doncaster in the Betfred Championship. Also known as Bobby Boucher from Waterboy and also has this as his email address.

He is a product of the Bradford Bulls Academy system.

Background
Rickett was born in Halifax, West Yorkshire, England.

Bradford Bulls

2016 - 2016 Season

Josh did not feature in the pre-season friendlies.

He played in the Championship Shield Game 6 (Workington Town).

2017 - 2017 Season

Rickett featured in the pre-season friendlies against Huddersfield Giants and Keighley Cougars.

Josh featured in Round 23 (Swinton Lions) then in the Championship Shield Game 1 (Toulouse Olympique) to Game 2 (Oldham) then in Game 4 (Batley Bulldogs). He scored against Oldham (1 try).

At the end of the season he signed a 2 year extension to his contract.

2018 - 2018 Season

Rickett featured in the pre-season friendlies against Halifax R.L.F.C., Sheffield Eagles and Dewsbury Rams.

He featured in the 2018 Challenge Cup in Round 4 (Hunslet R.L.F.C.). He scored against Hunslet R.L.F.C. (1 try).

2019 - 2019 Season

Josh featured in the pre-season friendly against York City Knights. At the end of the season, following the club's financial troubles, Rickett signed for Doncaster R.L.F.C.

Statistics
Statistics do not include pre-season friendlies.

References

External links
Bradford Bulls profile
Bulls profile
Elite Star profile

1997 births
Living people
Bradford Bulls players
Doncaster R.L.F.C. players
English rugby league players
Rugby league fullbacks
Rugby league players from Halifax, West Yorkshire
Rugby league wingers